Invictus is the eighth studio album from New York-based power metal band Virgin Steele. It is the third part of The Marriage of Heaven and Hell saga, exploring the relationships and conflicts between humanity and divinity. The album's name is Latin for Unconquered.

Track listing
All tracks by David DeFeis except "Defiance" by DeFeis / Edward Pursino

2014 Remastered 2nd CD: Fire Spirits (Bonus Tracks - Acoustic Versions)

Personnel

Band members
David DeFeis - all vocals, keyboards, orchestration, effects, producer
Edward Pursino - acoustic and electric guitars
Rob DeMartino - bass
Frank Gilchriest - drums

Production
Steve Young - producer, engineer, mixing
Michael Sarsfield - mastering

References

External links 
 Review on revelations.net

1998 albums
Virgin Steele albums
Noise Records albums